Eukaryotic translation elongation factor 1 alpha 1 pseudogene 43 (eEF1A3) is a protein that in humans is encoded by the EEF1A1P43 gene.

See also 
eEF-1

References